Peshcherka is a rural locality (selo), and the administrative center of Peshchersky Selsoviet, Zalesovsky District, Altai Krai, Russia. The population was 1,198 as of 2013. There are 13 streets.

Geography 
Peshcherka is located 20 km north of Zalesovo (the district's administrative centre) by road. Zalesovo is the nearest rural locality.

References 

Rural localities in Zalesovsky District